The 1992–93 Roller Hockey Champions Cup was the 29th edition of the Roller Hockey Champions Cup organized by CERH.

Igualada won their first title ever.

Teams
The champions of the main European leagues and Liceo, as title holder, played this competition, consisting in a double-legged knockout tournament.

Bracket

Source:

References

External links
 CERH website

1992 in roller hockey
1993 in roller hockey
Rink Hockey Euroleague